Choi Seung-wook (born 13 March 1976) is a South Korean handball player who competed in the 2004 Summer Olympics.

References

External links

1976 births
Living people
South Korean male handball players
Olympic handball players of South Korea
Handball players at the 2004 Summer Olympics